‘Live’ Bullet is a live album by American rock band Bob Seger & the Silver Bullet Band, released in April 1976. It was recorded at Cobo Hall in Detroit, Michigan, during the heyday of that arena's time as an important rock concert venue. The album is credited, along with Night Moves, with launching Seger's mainstream popularity.

History
Live' Bullet became a staple of FM rock radio in Detroit. Classics such as the live version of "Nutbush City Limits" and the medley of "Travelin' Man/Beautiful Loser" were among the most widely played live tracks on Detroit stations such as WWWW (W4), WRIF, and WABX. Other tracks such as "Let It Rock", "Turn the Page" and "Get Out of Denver" also received wide airplay in Detroit.

The success of Seger's music at this time, however, was highly regional, with Seger still remaining quite unknown in adjacent media markets such as Chicago. Even in his home state of Michigan, Seger often struggled to garner mass appeal outside the Metro Detroit area. In December, 1975, 3 months after Live Bullet was recorded, a scheduled concert at Western Michigan University was cancelled after only a few hundred advance tickets were sold.  In June 1976, Seger played the Pontiac Silverdome in metropolitan Detroit at a historic concert that also included Point Blank, Elvin Bishop and Todd Rundgren. 78,000 people were in attendance and the concert lasted until nearly 1:30 a.m.  The next night, Seger played for fewer than a thousand people in Chicago.

However, it was only in the following winter that the release of his next recording, Night Moves, launched Seger into more national markets. Over time, the life-on-the-road tale "Turn the Page" would become the most nationally played song from '''Live' Bullet, and a perennial favorite on album-oriented rock and classic rock stations.

For Detroit fans, however, the entire Live' Bullet recording captured a Detroit artist at the height of his energy and creativity, in front of a highly appreciative hometown crowd. Live' Bullet also captured the wild and free spirit of rock concerts in the seventies, and has great historic value in that regard.

Critical reception
Critic Dave Marsh called Live Bullet "one of the best live albums ever made."

In 2015, Live Bullet was ranked No. 26 on Rolling Stones "50 Greatest Live Albums of All Time" list. Readers of Rolling Stone ranked it No. 10 in a 2012 poll of all-time favourite live albums. In an article supporting the 2015 list, Seger states, "We were doing 250 to 300 shows a year before Live Bullet. We were playing five nights a week, sometimes six, as the Silver Bullet Band, and we just had that show down."

Track listing

The 2011 remastered CD reissue has one extra track, "I Feel Like Breaking Up Somebody’s Home", (3:05), recorded live at the Pontiac Silverdome.
 
The live version of the song "Katmandu" was also featured as the sole Bob Seger track as part of a promotional-only compilation album issued by Capitol records entitled The Greatest Music Ever Sold, which was distributed to record stores during the 1976 holiday season as part of Capitol's "Greatest Music Ever Sold" campaign, promoting 15 "best of" albums released by the record label. Live' Bullet'' is a live album and not a "best of" compilation, though several tracks were major regional hits ("Lookin' Back" #2 in Detroit, etc.).

Many songs from the album such as "Nutbush City Limits", "Lookin' Back", and "Turn the Page" became hit singles off the album, whereas their original studio versions were overlooked. "Lookin Back" was released as a single in 1971 but had very short lived success as it was not on an actual Seger album. It was originally performed by Seger's first band, The Bob Seger System, whereas the Live Bullet version featured The Silver Bullet Band.

Two of the songs on the album are actually medleys. "Bo Diddley" is a medley of "Bo Diddley" and "Who Do You Love?", while "Let It Rock" is a medley of "Let It Rock" and "Little Queenie" with some minor lyrical changes.  Additionally, the tracks Travelin' Man and Beautiful Loser feature no audible pause between the two, and are played as a single medley (though the CD has a digital track marker for each).  As a result, many album-oriented rock and classic rock radio stations have played them together as a medley.

The Silver Bullet Band
Bob Seger – lead vocals, guitar, piano
Drew Abbott – lead guitar, background vocals
Alto Reed – tenor saxophone, alto saxophone, baritone saxophone, percussion, background vocals
Robyn Robins – organ, clavinet, mellotron, piano on "Katmandu"
Chris Campbell – bass guitar, background vocals
Charlie Allen Martin – drums, background vocals, answer vocals on "Heavy Music", harmony vocals on "Jody Girl" and "Get Out of Denver"

Charts
Album

Singles
| "Nutbush City Limits" (Hot-100 #69) 
| "Travelin' Man" (uncharted)

Certifications

Notes

1976 live albums
Albums produced by Punch Andrews
Bob Seger live albums
Capitol Records live albums